Goykalovo is a rural locality (a khutor) in Degtyarenskoye Rural Settlement, Kamensky District, Voronezh Oblast, Russia. The population was 202 as of 2010. There are 4 streets.

Geography 
Goykalovo is located 22 km southwest of Kamenka (the district's administrative centre) by road. Sitnikovo is the nearest rural locality.

References 

Rural localities in Kamensky District, Voronezh Oblast